Brand Lake is a lake in Carver County, Minnesota, in the United States.

According to historian Warren Upham, a lake called Brandt Lake in Carver County was named for Leroy Brandt, an early settler.

References

Lakes of Minnesota
Lakes of Carver County, Minnesota